Hippuris vulgaris (from Greek: ἵππος — horse and οὐρά — tail), known as mare's-tail or common mare's-tail, is a common aquatic plant of Eurasia and North America ranging from Greenland to the Tibetan Plateau to Arizona. It prefers non-acidic waters.

Description
The common mare's tail is a creeping, perennial herb, found in shallow waters and mud flats. It roots underwater, but most of its leaves are above the water surface. The leaves occur in whorls of 6–12; those above water are 0.5 to 2.5 cm long and up to 3 mm wide, whereas those under water are thinner and limper, and longer than those above water, especially in deeper streams. The stems are solid and unbranched but often curve, and can be up to 60 cm long. In shallow water they project 20–30 cm out of the water. It grows from stout rhizomes. The flowers are inconspicuous, and not all plants produce them. Studies of H. vulgaris in the Tibetan Plateau have shown that it is a prolific methane emitter. H. vulgaris's roots extend into the anoxic zone of wetland soils and create a conduit for methane produced in the anoxic zone to travel to the atmosphere.

Uses
It can also be a troublesome weed, obstructing the flow of water in rivers and ditches.

References

External links
Jepson Manual Treatment
USDA Plants Profile

Plantaginaceae
Freshwater plants
Plants described in 1753
Taxa named by Carl Linnaeus